Martin Peter Foley  (born 17 May 1962) is a former Australian politician. He was a Labor Party member of the Victorian Legislative Assembly between 2007 and 2022, representing Albert Park. He was the Minister for Equality in the First and Second Andrews Ministry between December 2014 and June 2022 and the Minister for Health and Minister for Ambulance Services between September 2020 and June 2022. He was previously the Minister for Mental Health and Minister for Creative Industries prior to September 2020.

Early life
Foley was born in Mornington. He was awarded a Bachelor of Arts (history and politics) in 1987 from Monash University and received a Master of Commerce in 2000 from the University of Melbourne. From 1988–2003, he worked with the Australian Services Union before becoming chief of staff to the state Minister for Agriculture. In 2006, he became Chief of Staff to the Minister for Police.

Political career
In 2007, Foley was elected to the Legislative Assembly following his preselection as the Labor candidate for the seat of Albert Park in the by-election which resulted from Deputy Premier John Thwaites's resignation. With the defeat of the Brumby Government in December 2010 and the appointment of Daniel Andrews as the new leader of the Labor Party, Foley became a Parliamentary Secretary to various Opposition Shadow Ministers until in late 2013, Foley was appointed as Shadow Minister for Water, Arts & Youth Affairs and Shadow Minister assisting the Leader of the Opposition on Equality.

Following the election of the Andrews Labor Government at the November 2014 election, Foley was appointed to Cabinet as Minister for Housing, Disability and Ageing, Minister for Mental Health, Minister for Equality and Minister for Creative Industries. He lost his housing and disability portfolios following the 2018 state election.

On 26 September 2020, following the resignation of Victorian health minister Jenny Mikakos that morning,  Victorian premier Daniel Andrews announced that Foley would be her replacement as health minister. Foley was sworn in as the Minister for Health and Minister for Ambulance Services later that day. His portfolios of creative industries and mental health were taken over by Danny Pearson and James Merlino three days later on 29 September 2020.

In June 2022, Foley announced he would retire at the November state election, wanting to spend more time with his family. He stepped down from his ministerial roles on 27 June 2022.

References

External links
 Parliamentary voting record of Martin Foley on Victorian Parliament Tracker

1962 births
Living people
Australian Labor Party members of the Parliament of Victoria
Members of the Victorian Legislative Assembly
21st-century Australian politicians
Labor Left politicians
People from Mornington, Victoria
Politicians from Melbourne